Van Bebber is a surname. Notable people with the surname include:

Jack van Bebber (1907–1986), American sport wrestler
Jim Van Bebber (born 1964), American film director
Wilhelm Jacob van Bebber (1841–1909), German meteorologist

See also
Van Bibber

Surnames of Dutch origin